Ultimate Mortal Kombat 3 is a fighting game in the Mortal Kombat series, developed and released by Midway to arcades in 1995. It is a standalone update of 1995's earlier Mortal Kombat 3 with an altered gameplay system, additional characters like the returning favorites Kitana and Scorpion who were missing from Mortal Kombat 3, and some new features.

Several home port versions of the game were soon released after the arcade original. Although none were completely identical to the arcade version, the Sega Saturn port came closest. Some later home versions followed the arcade original with more accuracy. Some versions were released under different titles: Mortal Kombat Advance for the Game Boy Advance in 2001 and Ultimate Mortal Kombat for the Nintendo DS in 2007. An iOS version recreating the game using a 3D graphics engine was released by Electronic Arts in 2010.

Ultimate Mortal Kombat 3 was mostly well-received and has been considered a high point for the Mortal Kombat series. However, the iOS remake and some other home versions were received poorly. Ultimate Mortal Kombat 3 was updated to include more content from previous games in the series as Mortal Kombat Trilogy in 1996. The 2011 compilation Mortal Kombat Arcade Kollection includes an emulation of UMK3 as well as the first Mortal Kombat and Mortal Kombat II.

Gameplay 

Two new gameplay modes have been introduced since the original Mortal Kombat 3: the 2-on-2 mode which was similar to an Endurance match but with as many as three human players in a given round on both sides (these had not been seen in the series since the first Mortal Kombat), and a new eight-player Tournament mode. An extra Master difficulty is present. Shao Kahn's Lost Treasures – selectable prizes, of which some are extra fights and others lead to various cutscenes or other things – are introduced after either the main game or the eight-player Tournament are completed.

To balance the gameplay, some characters were given new moves and some existing moves were altered. Some characters were given extra combos and some combos were made to cause less damage. Chain combos could be started by using a jump punch (vertical or angled) or a vertical jump kick, which creates more opportunities to use combos. Combos that knock opponents in the air no longer send one's opponent to the level above in multi-layered levels; only regular uppercuts do this.

The computer-controlled opponent AI was improved in the game. However, three new flaws were introduced along with the revisions: while backflipping away from an opponent, if the player performs a jump kick, the AI character will always throw a projectile; this leaves the computer character vulnerable to some attacks and can easily lead into a devastating combo. If the player walks back-and-forth within a certain range of the AI character, the opponent will mimic the player's walking movements for the whole round and never attack. If the computer opponent is cornered, the player can repeatedly perform punches without the AI character stumbling back, thus allowing the player to win easily.

UMK3 features several new backgrounds: Scorpion's Lair/Hell (this stage also contains a new Stage Fatality, where an uppercut can send the opponent into a river of lava); Jade's Desert (in a reference to his MK3 ending, Cyrax is seen stuck waist-deep in sand in the background); River Kombat/The Waterfront; Kahn's Kave/The Cavern; Blue Portal/Lost (a combination of the background from the UMK3 "Choose Your Destiny" screen, the Pit 3 bridge, and the mountains and bridge from the Pit II in Mortal Kombat II); Noob's Dorfen (based on the Balcony stage, which can now be played using a Kombat Kode without having to fight Noob Saibot to see it as in MK3). Before reaching any of the original MK3 backgrounds in 1- or 2-player mode, the game must cycle through all of the UMK3 exclusive backgrounds twice. Scorpion's Lair, Secret Cave and Abandoned River stages are selectable by using a password while on the missing Bank Stage cycle. In Scorpion's Lair, fighters can uppercut each other into Kahn's Kave. The original red portal background used for the "Choose Your Destiny" screen is now blue.

Some elements from MK3 are missing in UMK3. The only biographies featured are those of Kitana, Jade, Scorpion and Reptile (the ninja characters who were not included in MK3), which are the only four shown during attract mode, while all of the biographies and the full-body portraits of the MK3 characters are missing. The biographies that do appear in the game are presented differently from those in MK3, as are the endings. The storyline images and text do not appear. Finally, the Bank and Hidden Portal stages from MK3 were removed (Jade's Desert serves as a placeholder where The Bank stage used to appear once the player reaches the original MK3 level cycle).

The Sega Genesis and SNES versions were released the same month as Mortal Kombat Trilogy and incorporated that game's finishing move Brutalities, an 11-button combo which causes the character to rapidly beat on their opponent until they explode.

Characters 

The arcade version features all playable characters from Mortal Kombat 3, who were portrayed by the same actors: Cyrax (Sal Divita), Liu Kang (Eddie Wong), Kabal (Richard Divizio), Kano (Richard Divizio), Kung Lao (Tony Marquez), Stryker (Michael O'Brien), Jax Briggs (John Parrish), Nightwolf (Sal Divita), Sektor (Sal Divita), Shang Tsung (John Turk), Sheeva (stop motion), Sindel (Lia Montelongo), Smoke (Sal Divita), Sonya Blade (Kerri Hoskins) and Sub-Zero (John Turk). The boss and sub-boss from MK3, Motaro (stop motion) and Shao Kahn (Brian Glynn, voiced by Steve Ritchie), also return. Shang Tsung's transformations are accompanied by announcements of the name of the character he is changing into.

There are four additional characters that are playable from the start: Several ninja characters from the first two games that have been absent from Mortal Kombat 3 return in Ultimate Mortal Kombat 3, including Kitana, Jade, Reptile and Scorpion on the prototype version; a new Ultimate Kombat Kode was added in revision 1.0 to enable Mileena, Ermac, and Classic Sub-Zero as secret characters.

Jade (Becky Gable) – After the renegade princess Kitana killed her evil twin Mileena and escaped from Outworld to Earth, her close friend Jade was appointed by the emperor Shao Kahn to find and bring her back alive.
Kitana (Becky Gable) – She is accused of treason after killing Mileena; she now attempts to reach queen Sindel to warn her of their true past.
Reptile (John Turk) – As one of Shao Kahn's most trusted servants, Reptile assists Jade in the hunt for Kitana, but with secret orders enabling him to kill her if necessary.
Scorpion (John Turk) – Scorpion escapes from Earth's hell after Shao Kahn's failed attempt at stealing the souls of Earthrealm. He eventually joins the struggle against Outworld.

More are unlockable via the Ultimate Kombat Kode:
Classic Sub-Zero (John Turk) – Having been seemingly killed in the first game, Sub-Zero mysteriously returns to again attempt the assassination of Shang Tsung.
Ermac (John Turk) – A mysterious warrior that exists as a life force of the souls of dead Outworld warriors in Shao Kahn's possession.
Mileena (Becky Gable) – After she was killed by Kitana, Mileena was brought back to life by Shao Kahn to help him defeat Earth's warriors with her combat skills and a mind-reading connection to her sister.

Finally, Smoke's human form can be unlocked via a code entered right before a match.

Returning characters were warmly welcomed by critics as an improvement to the "lackluster roster" of MK3 with "the greatly missed" Kitana, Mileena, Reptile, and especially Scorpion. The female ninja characters (Mileena, Kitana and Jade), returning from Mortal Kombat II, were portrayed by a different actress, Becky Gable, due to the lawsuit issued by Katalin Zamiar and some of the other MKII actors against Midway; they were also given a different set of outfits and hairstyles, which were again identical for all of them (in the game there are just three palette swapped character models for male, female and cyborg ninjas, not counting the MK3 Sub-Zero but including Classic Sub-Zero).

There are also two new hidden opponents and console exclusives: Noob Saibot (John Turk) and Rain (John Turk). Although Noob Saibot was featured in the original MK3, he is no longer a palette swap of Kano but instead of a ninja; as before, he is fought via a Kombat Kode. Rain is featured in the game's opening montage (except on the Sega Saturn), but he is actually a fake hidden character that is not found in the arcade game. Both Noob Saibot and Rain were made playable for the 16-bit console versions, although Sheeva was removed, and the two boss characters are playable via a cheat code.

Release

Like previous Mortal Kombat games, Ultimate Mortal Kombat 3 debuted in arcades. It first appeared in select arcades in early November 1995. Arcade owners who already owned Mortal Kombat 3 were provided with the option to upgrade to Ultimate Mortal Kombat 3 at no cost. In 2008, the Mortal Kombat series co-creator, designer and producer Ed Boon said that UMK3 is his favorite 2D Mortal Kombat title. It was also the last game he has programmed himself.

Ultimate Mortal Kombat 3 was ported to many home consoles with varying results, including home (Super NES, Genesis and Sega Saturn) and portable consoles (Game Boy Advance and Nintendo DS), the Xbox Live Arcade, and iOS-based mobile devices and mobile phones. The game was also bundled with the premium version of Mortal Kombat: Armageddon for the PlayStation 2 and included in compilation release Mortal Kombat Arcade Kollection for the PC, PlayStation 3 and Xbox 360. The developers and publishers of the various releases included Acclaim Entertainment, Avalanche Software, Electronic Arts, Eurocom, Warner Bros. Interactive Entertainment, and Williams Entertainment. The later versions usually feature online play and other improvements over the arcade version, and in some cases even 3D graphics.

A port for the 3DO Interactive Multiplayer was being developed by New Level but was canceled in 1996. Cited reasons for the cancellation include development delays which pushed the release date too far beyond the peak of Mortal Kombat 3s popularity and the fact that the Mortal Kombat franchise had no established presence on the console.

Ultimate Mortal Kombat 3 Wave Net
Ultimate Mortal Kombat 3 Wave Net (an abbreviation for Williams Action Video Entertainment Network) was a rare network version of the game that allowed for online multiplayer matches. It was tested only in the Chicago and San Francisco areas that used a dedicated T1 line, connected directly to Midway's Chicago headquarters. It is highly unlikely that any Wave Net test games were ever released to the public after the infrastructure was dismantled, and so there are no known ROM image dumps of this version. One of the reasons this version was not widely adopted was the cost of T1 lines at the time: the setup cost several thousand dollars per arcade installation, plus a few hundred dollars for each cabinet using the hardware. Williams' plan was to use WaveNet to upload new games and game updates, which they would provide to arcade owners for free in exchange for a cut of the games' revenues.

Super NES
The Super Nintendo Entertainment System (SNES) version was developed by Avalanche Software and published by Williams Entertainment in June, 1996 in North America, and by Acclaim Entertainment on November 28, 1996, in Europe. This version of the game uses the code from Sculptured Software's prior port of the original MK3 released a year earlier. The limitations of the system led to many cuts being made to fit everything in the SNES cartridge: the announcer no longer says the characters' names, Sheeva was removed, only the five new arcade backgrounds are featured, and Shao Kahn's Lost Treasures chest has only 10 boxes instead of 12. Also, many changes affect the game's finishing moves: Rain and Noob Saibot have no regular Fatalities or other finishing moves; Kitana's "Kiss of Death" only inflates the opponent's heads, reusing the effect from Kabal's "Air Pump" Fatality; Sonya Blade's Friendship from MK3 is used, as opposed to her Friendship from the arcade version of UMK3; Ermac's head punch Fatality is altered; Scorpion's "Hellraiser" Fatality is different (he takes the opponent back to the Hell stage, where the opponent simply burns to ash) and is no longer censored like the arcade one. Animality finishing moves were also removed, ironically keeping the Mercy move, which originally served as a requirement for Animalities in MK3. On the other hand, Brutalities were introduced; a finishing move in which the player attacks their opponent with a series of kicks and punches which result in the victim exploding. At the same time, some changes were actually improvements over the arcade version. Rain and Noob Saibot are made into playable characters for the first time. Mileena, Ermac, and Classic Sub-Zero are playable out of the box. Motaro and Shao Kahn are unlockable characters for two-player fights, although only one player can choose a boss at a given time. A cheat code allows access to three separate cheat menus, where the player can drastically alter gameplay, access hidden content or view the characters' endings, among many other things.

Sega Genesis
The Sega Genesis version was developed by Avalanche Software and published by Williams Entertainment on October 11, 1996, in North America and by Acclaim Entertainment on November 28, 1996, in Europe (Mega Drive version). Much like the SNES port, this version of the game uses the code from Sculptured Software's prior port of the original MK3 released a year earlier. Due to the limitations of the system's hardware, the Sega Genesis port featured inferior graphics and sound to these of the SNES port. Like on the SNES, Sheeva was removed, Shao Kahn's treasure chest has only 10 boxes, the announcer no longer says the characters' names, Kitana's "Kiss of Death" only inflates heads, Scorpion's "Hellraiser" Fatality is different, Sonya's Friendship from Mortal Kombat 3 is used, and the game retains the Bank stage. There were, however, several differences. Unlike the SNES version, the Genesis version features more stages: with the addition of the five new ones, it also features six of the original ones from MK3, including the Subway, Bank, Rooftop, Soul Chamber, The Temple, and The Pit 3. There are several additional cuts regarding special and finishing moves: both Animalities and Mercy were removed; Rain and Noob were given a Brutality, but no other finishing moves; Human Smoke shares Scorpion's combos, rather than having unique ones; in Stryker's Friendship, the running characters are replaced by dogs. It did, however, have exclusive features in comparison to the arcade. Again, like the SNES port, Rain and Noob Saibot are made playable characters along with bosses Motaro and Shao Kahn, and Mileena, Ermac, and Classic Sub-Zero are playable without any need of codes; Brutalities are also included in this version. Shang Tsung can morph into Robot Smoke, Noob Saibot, and Rain, which is not possible in the arcades, while Nightwolf is given the Red Shadow shoulder move that was later used in MKT. This version also features a rendition of Pong entitled MK4, which is the same as the one that appeared in the Genesis/Mega Drive port of MK3.

Sega Saturn
The Sega Saturn version was developed by Eurocom and published in 1996 by Williams Entertainment in North America and by GT Interactive in Europe. It is based directly on the version of Mortal Kombat 3 that was released for the PlayStation and PC. It thus has the same graphical quality and menu system. Since the arcade intro sequence is missing, Rain does not appear in the game, yet the message Kombat Kode "Rain can be found in the Graveyard" is still displayed. It also contains several elements of MK3 that were removed for the arcade version of UMK3, such as "The Bank" level and Noob Saibot being a shadow Kano as in MK3 (not a black ninja as in the arcade version of UMK3). There are a few new Kombat Kodes, but several that were present in the arcade release do not work any longer. The secret characters can be unlocked via a secret options screen, eliminating the need to enter three separate Kombat Kodes to unlock them (this is much faster, especially since unlocked characters cannot be saved); the Kombat Kodes themselves were also shortened to have six slots instead of ten.

Mortal Kombat Advance
Mortal Kombat Advance is the title given to the Game Boy Advance port of the game, which was developed by Virtucraft and published by Midway Games in North America on December 12, 2001, and in Europe on March 1, 2002. This version is based on the SNES port, but each character (except for Noob Saibot and the bosses) has only one individual Fatality and one Friendship. Three hidden characters can be unlocked by completing any tower other than Novice: Human Smoke (Warrior), Motaro (Master), and Shao Kahn (Grand Master). The GBA control system features two fewer buttons than those used in UMK3, which results in many special moves' button sequences being consolidated or changed. The violence in this game was toned down due to a younger fanbase using the GBA (though the game is still rated "M for Mature") and there is less blood.

PlayStation 2
On all "Premium Edition" copies of the PlayStation 2 version of 2006's Mortal Kombat: Armageddon, a near arcade-perfect version of the game is included in the first disc. However, it is impossible to save unlocked characters in this version without accessing the EJB menu.

Xbox Live Arcade
The Xbox Live Arcade version has very few differences from the arcade original. There are some minor glitches in the network play on Xbox Live and there is no option to save the Kombat Kode unlocked characters. Online leaderboards were created to keep track of all time network stats and friends, the screen size was adjustable for anything between 4:3 and 16:9 televisions, and unlockable Achievements were also included. The game was accidentally released by Warner Bros. Interactive on the digital download service on the Friday evening of October 20, 2006, but was quickly pulled about 20 minutes later. According to Xbox Live director of programming, Major Nelson, an emergency meeting was called to discuss what to do about the game's release, knowing some keen users had already purchased the game. The decision was made to go on and release the game on the next morning, four days before its scheduled release date. As of 2010, it remained as the only post-launch XBLA game to be released on any day other than Wednesday. As of June 2010, the game cannot be downloaded as it was removed from XBLA due to "publisher evolving rights and permissions". Those who have purchased the game before this date can re-download and play online.

Nintendo DS
On June 27, 2007, MK co-creator Ed Boon officially confirmed a Nintendo DS port entitled Ultimate Mortal Kombat. The game, developed by Other Ocean Interactive and published by Midway games on November 12, 2007, in North America and on December 7, 2007, in Europe, is an arcade-perfect port of UMK3, and includes Wi-Fi play and brings back the  "Puzzle Kombat" minigame from Mortal Kombat: Deception. Additionally, when unlocking Ermac, Mileena and Classic Sub-Zero with Kombat Kodes on the VS screen, they will remain unlocked, thanks to the inclusion of player profiles.

Mobile (J2ME)
In December 2010, EA Mobile released a Java-based port of the game for mobile phones. The game features only six playable fighters (Cyrax, Liu Kang, Scorpion, Sub-Zero, Sonya, Kitana) and a single boss character (Shao Kahn).

iOS
In December 2010, Electronic Arts published their remake of the game for iOS. It features a wireless two-player mode that could function over either Wi-Fi or Bluetooth connections. Although the gameplay remains true to the 2D original, the digitized sprites of the arcade machine were replaced with 3D rendered graphics. Control was implemented via an on-screen joystick and buttons, utilizing the iOS-based devices' capacitive touchscreen. Network communication allowed for scores to be posted online, and a simplified control scheme was also included to improve accessibility. The character roster was incomplete, featuring only nine playable characters (Sub-Zero, Scorpion, Kitana, Nightwolf, Jax, Sheeva, Sonya, Liu Kang, and Stryker). Success at playing the game would unlock two additional fighters (Ermac and Jade). Both boss characters were included as CPU-only opponents. The game also features achievements. In June 2011, EA updated it to include the full roster and six new arenas.

Mortal Kombat Arcade Kollection

The game is a part of the digital release package Mortal Kombat Arcade Kollection, developed by Other Ocean Interactive and NetherRealm Studios and published by Warner Bros. Interactive for the PC, PlayStation 3 and Xbox 360 in 2012. Arcade Kollection also includes the first Mortal Kombat and Mortal Kombat II.

Arcade1Up
In 2019, Arcade1Up released a home arcade cabinet that included Ultimate Mortal Kombat 3, alongside Mortal Kombat and Mortal Kombat II.

Reception

Critical response

Reviewing the arcade version, a Next Generation critic expressed concern that the Mortal Kombat series was headed for the same rut Street Fighter had fallen into, in which unnecessary updates of the same game replaced new installments. He remarked that even the biggest change the game made, the four new characters, was rendered uninteresting by their recycling of the graphic sets of previous characters. However, he added that "To be fair, there is none of the MK quality, detail, or gameplay missing, just about everything you want is there." According to a later IGN retrospective, "the revision helped to win over some frustrated fans, but followers of Johnny Cage, Raiden, and Baraka remained perturbed."

Critical reception of the game has varied depending on the version under review. The initial releases were generally well-received by critics, especially the 32-bit Sega Saturn version. EGM named it their "Game of the Month", commenting that it is a "near-perfect" translation of the arcade version, with the only problem being the long loading times. VideoGames rated this port a review score of 8/10, calling it "simply a great game" and stating that "if there was ever a definitive MK game, this is it." In GamePro, Major Mike summarized that "Saturn owners left out in the cold when MK 3 hit the PlayStation can now gloat: Ultimate has arrived, and it offers more fighters, moves, fatalities, and secrets than MK 3." While he criticized some elements of the game itself, such as the weak fatalities, he held that the Saturn conversion faithfully replicates the arcade game in every respect. A reviewer for Next Generation agreed that the Saturn version is an impeccable conversion apart from the "miserable necessity" of load times during Shang Tsung's morphs, but criticized Ultimate Mortal Kombat 3 for offering too little improvement over the original Mortal Kombat 3. While noting that since the original MK3 had never been released for the Saturn, the publishers could not be accused of trying to sell consumers the same game twice, he felt MK3 was a slapdash and unexciting entry in the Mortal Kombat series. Rich Leadbetter of Maximum commented that while Ultimate Mortal Kombat 3 does not measure up to contemporary Capcom fighters in terms of gameplay, it is unsurpassed in its huge number of secrets and replayability. He also praised Eurocom's conversion, saying it is a superior effort to Williams' conversion of MK3 for the PlayStation. Rad Automatic of Sega Saturn Magazine, like EGM and GamePro, praised the game's retention of the full content and quality of the arcade version, but also added, "Capcom have just released three bona fide awesome 2D beat 'em ups onto the Saturn, and ... I couldn't honestly say that I rate MK3 above them." A review by Computer and Video Games called it an "excellent conversion of a great coin-op", as well as "[e]ssential for fans, and something well worth consideration from all Saturn owners."

Reviewing the Genesis version, GamePros Bruised Lee said the graphics and controls are solid by 16-bit standards, but the arcade version's voices and music are poorly reproduced, and the game offers too little beyond the previous installments of the series, all of which had already been released for Genesis. He summarized, "Mortal Kombat fans looking for a quick fix should enjoy UMK3, and players new to MK will find this game a treat. If you're looking for a new fighting game experience, however, you'll have to wait for MK4." He scored the Super NES version lower in fun factor but higher in graphics and sound, stating that this version duplicates the arcade game's voices and music very well. However, he repeated the central point that the game is essentially a slightly modified retread of Mortal Kombat 3. The four reviewers of Electronic Gaming Monthly likewise praised the quality of the Super NES conversion while noting that it offered little new for fans of the series. Dan Hsu in particular remarked, "Does anyone else feel a little cheated? After all, Mortal Kombat 3 was released for the SNES just a year ago. Now, we're getting Ultimate MK3 (a decent improvement over MK3) while a couple of other systems are getting Mortal Kombat Trilogy. Perhaps SNES carts can't hold enough memory to handle Trilogy. Even so, I wouldn't want to buy UMK3 knowing that a better MK package exists." The SNES version was nominated for Nintendo Power Awards '96 in the category "Best Tournament Fighting Game". Years later, Ultimate Mortal Kombat 3 was also named as the best retro Mortal Kombat game by Alex Langley of Arcade Sushi in 2013.

On the other hand, Mortal Kombat Advance, the later port for the Game Boy Advance, was panned by critics. It was given a review score of 2.9 by GameSpots Jeff Gerstmann for how it "plays little to nothing like the game it's based on," and held a rating of only 34% at GameRankings. GameSpot named Mortal Kombat Advance the worst Game Boy Advance game of 2002, with the editors dubbing it "violently broken". Electronic Gaming Monthly called the game "a circus train wreck" and "a steaming pile of bloody dog krap." The three reviewers gave it 0.0, 1.5, and 0.5, out of 10. The 0.0 score, given by the magazine editor Dan "Shoe" Hsu, was the first in EGM's history. Advance was included among the worst games of all time by GamesRadar in 2014.

Ultimate Mortal Kombat for the Nintendo DS was considered much better than the GBA game. It was given a review score of 7.8 out of 10 from IGN's Greg Miller, who wrote that "if all you want is a really solid, fun version of Mortal Kombat 3 that can go online, that's what you're going to get. It's good stuff all around." GameSpot's "Best and Worst of 2006" included the XBLA version among the five best fighting games of the year.

IGN rated the game 97th on its "Top 100 SNES Games of All Time". In 2018, Complex listed the game 68th in their "The Best Super Nintendo Games of All Time" writing:  "Although not as jaw-dropping as MK2 was when it first came out on the SNES, this was still a great port of the arcade classic."

Ed Boon, one of the creators of the series, has stated Ultimate Mortal Kombat 3 to be his favorite Mortal Kombat arcade title.

Legal controversy
U.S. Appeals Court Judge Richard Posner considered Ultimate Mortal Kombat 3 to be "a feminist violent video game". Finding that Indianapolis' attempt to ban Ultimate Mortal Kombat 3 violated the First Amendment, Judge Posner wrote "the game is feminist in depicting a woman as fully capable of holding her own in violent combat with heavily armed men. It thus has a message, even an 'ideology,' just as books and movies do." Judge Posner further marveled that "The woman wins all the duels. She is as strong as the men, she is more skillful, more determined, and she does not flinch at the sight of blood."

Sales
Due in part to the Genesis and Super NES versions being delayed until the 1996 Christmas season, spawning rumors that they would never be released, those versions met with disappointing sales.

Legacy

Mortal Kombat Trilogy was released by Midway in 1996 as a follow-up to Ultimate Mortal Kombat 3. Unlike Ultimate Mortal Kombat 3, Mortal Kombat Trilogy was not released in arcades but was instead released for the Sony PlayStation, Nintendo 64, Sega Saturn and PC, as well as for the Game.com and R-Zone. Mortal Kombat Trilogy features the same gameplay and story, but includes all of the characters from the first three games, adding several completely new ones. Also, it introduces features such as the "Aggressor" bar, a meter that fills during the course of the match to make a player character faster and stronger for a short time, and the Brutality finishing moves that were introduced in the 16-bit versions of Ultimate Mortal Kombat 3.

Ultimate Mortal Kombat 3 was also later remastered to be released as part of the Mortal Kombat Arcade Kollection in 2011.

Notes

References

External links 
 (iOS remake)

Ultimate Mortal Kombat 3 - The Mortal Kombat Wiki
UMK3 at Mortal Kombat Online 

Dinosaurs in video games
1995 video games
Arcade video games
Cancelled 3DO Interactive Multiplayer games
Game Boy Advance games
IOS games
IPod games
Mortal Kombat games
Nintendo DS games
Post-apocalyptic video games
PlayStation Network games
Sega Genesis games
Sega Saturn games
Super Nintendo Entertainment System games
Midway video games
Fighting games
Video games with digitized sprites
Xbox 360 Live Arcade games
Multiplayer and single-player video games
Video games scored by Dan Forden
Williams video games
GT Interactive games
Eurocom games
Electronic Arts games
Avalanche Software games
Acclaim Entertainment games
J2ME games
Video games developed in the United States
Other Ocean Interactive games